Allsvenskan 1930–31, part of the 1930–31 Swedish football season, was the seventh Allsvenskan season played. The first match was played 3 August 1930 and the last match was played 7 June 1931. GAIS won the league ahead of runners-up AIK, while Redbergslids IK and Sandvikens IF were relegated.

Participating clubs

League table

Promotions, relegations and qualifications

Results

Top scorers

References 

Print

Online

Allsvenskan seasons
1930–31 in Swedish association football leagues
Sweden